is a district located in Okayama Prefecture, Japan.

In 2003 the district had an estimated population of 48,246 and a density of 58.53 persons per km2. The total area is 824.35 km2.

In 2005, the component towns and villages of Chūka, Katsuyama, Kawakami, Kuse, Mikamo, Ochiai, Yatsuka, Yubara, as well as the neighboring town of Hokubō (from Jōbō District) united to form the city of Maniwa. Currently only one village, Shinjō, belongs to Maniwa District.

Current towns and villages (after the formation of Maniwa City)
Shinjō

Former towns and villages
Chūka
Katsuyama
Kawakami
Kuse
Mikamo
Ochiai
Shinjō
Yatsuka
Yubara

Districts in Okayama Prefecture